Adventure in the Bronx is a 1941 American short documentary film directed by Joseph Krumgold and produced for the New York Zoological Society. It tells the story of a boy exploring a zoo. It was nominated for an Academy Award for Best Documentary Short. It was later reissued by Warner Bros. under the name Sweeney Steps Out in the Hollywood Novelties series. Joseph Krumgold later wrote the book Sweeney's Adventure based on the film.

References

External links

1941 films
1941 documentary films
1941 short films
1940s short documentary films
American short documentary films
American black-and-white films
Black-and-white documentary films
Documentary films about New York City
Films set in the Bronx
1940s English-language films
1940s American films